Len Ortman ( – May 17, 1992) was a Canadian football player who played for the Saskatchewan Roughriders. He played junior football in Regina.

References

1920s births
Saskatchewan Roughriders players
1992 deaths